Amblyptila cynanchi is a moth of the family Gracillariidae. It is known from South Africa.

The larvae feed on Cynanchum ellipticum and Cynanchum obtusifolium. They mine the leaves of their host plant. The mine has the form of a moderate, irregularly rounded or oval, transparent, whitish blotch-mine.

References

Endemic moths of South Africa
Acrocercopinae
Moths described in 1961
Moths of Africa